The 2006–07 Welsh League Cup season was won by Caersws FC, beating Rhyl FC in the final. It was the third victory for Caersws FC in the competition, and the fourth appearance by Rhyl FC in the final. The final took place at Park Avenue, in Aberystwyth, Wales. The match was refereed by Brian Lawlor.

Round and draw dates
Source

Group stage
Sources

Group A

Group B

Group C

Group D

Knockout stage
Source

Quarter-finals

|}

Semi-finals

 
|}

Final

See also
 Welsh League Cup
 Welsh Premier League
 Welsh Cup

References

External links
Official League Cup Website
 Welsh-Premier.com Loosemores League Cup
Loosemores Solicitors Official Website

Welsh League Cup seasons
League Cup